Newcastle railway station, also known as Newcastle Central Station, is the main railway station in the city of Newcastle upon Tyne, England

Newcastle railway station may also refer to:
Newcastle New Bridge Street railway station, another station in Newcastle upon Tyne, England, which closed in 1909
Newcastle railway station (Northern Ireland), a former station in Newcastle, County Down
Newcastle railway station, New South Wales, which was the main railway station in the city of Newcastle, New South Wales, Australia; replaced by Newcastle Interchange
Civic railway station, in Newcastle, New South Wales, originally called Newcastle Station